This is a list of 125 species in Cyrtopogon, a genus of robber flies in the family Asilidae.

Cyrtopogon species

 Cyrtopogon ablautoides Melander, 1923 i c g
 Cyrtopogon africanus Ricardo, 1925 c g
 Cyrtopogon albibarbatus Lehr, 1998 c g
 Cyrtopogon albifacies Johnson, 1942 i c g
 Cyrtopogon albifrons Wilcox and Martin, 1936 i c g
 Cyrtopogon albovarians Curran, 1924 i c g
 Cyrtopogon aldrichi Wilcox and Martin, 1936 i c g
 Cyrtopogon alleni Back, 1909 i c g
 Cyrtopogon annulatus Hermann, 1906 c g
 Cyrtopogon anomalus Cole, 1919 i c g
 Cyrtopogon auratus Cole, 1919 i c g b
 Cyrtopogon aurifex Osten Sacken, 1877 i c g
 Cyrtopogon auripilosus Wilcox & Martin, 1936 i c g b
 Cyrtopogon banksi Wilcox & Martin, 1936 i c g b
 Cyrtopogon basingeri Wilcox and Martin, 1936 i c g
 Cyrtopogon beameri Wilcox and Martin, 1936 i c g
 Cyrtopogon bigelowi Curran, 1924 i c g
 Cyrtopogon bimacula (Walker, 1851) i b
 Cyrtopogon bimaculus (Walker, 1851) c g
 Cyrtopogon caesius Melander, 1923 i c g
 Cyrtopogon californicus Wilcox & Martin, 1936 c g
 Cyrtopogon callipedilus Loew, 1874 c g b
 Cyrtopogon carpathicus (Bezzi, 1927) c g
 Cyrtopogon centralis Loew, 1871 c g
 Cyrtopogon chagnoni Curran, 1939 i c g
 Cyrtopogon culminus Bigot, 1885 c g
 Cyrtopogon curistylus Curran, 1923 g
 Cyrtopogon curtipennis Wilcox and Martin, 1936 i c g
 Cyrtopogon curtistylus Curran, 1923 i c g
 Cyrtopogon cymbalista Osten Sacken, 1877 i c g
 Cyrtopogon dasyllis Williston, 1893 i c g b
 Cyrtopogon dasylloides Williston, 1883 i c g
 Cyrtopogon distinctitarsus Adisoemarto, 1967 i c g
 Cyrtopogon dubius Williston, 1883 i c g
 Cyrtopogon evidens Osten Sacken, 1877 i c g b
 Cyrtopogon falto (Walker, 1849) i c g b
 Cyrtopogon fulvicornis (Macquart, 1834) c g
 Cyrtopogon fumipennis Wilcox and Martin, 1936 i c g
 Cyrtopogon glarealis Melander, 1923 i c g
 Cyrtopogon gobiensis Lehr, 1998 c g
 Cyrtopogon gorodkovi Lehr, 1966 c g
 Cyrtopogon grisescens Lehr, 1966 c g
 Cyrtopogon grunini Lehr, 1998 c g
 Cyrtopogon idahoensis Wilcox and Martin, 1936 i c g
 Cyrtopogon infuscatus Cole, 1919 i c g
 Cyrtopogon inversus Curran, 1923 i c g b
 Cyrtopogon jakutensis Lehr, 1998 c g
 Cyrtopogon jemezi Wilcox & Martin, 1936 i c g b
 Cyrtopogon khasiensis Bromley, 1935 c g
 Cyrtopogon kirilli Lehr, 1977 c g
 Cyrtopogon kovalevi Lehr, 1998 c g
 Cyrtopogon kozlovi Lehr, 1998 c g
 Cyrtopogon kushka Lehr, 1998 c g
 Cyrtopogon laphrides Walker, 1851 c g
 Cyrtopogon laphriformis Curran, 1923 i c g b
 Cyrtopogon lapponius (Zetterstedt, 1838) c g
 Cyrtopogon lateralis (Fallen, 1814) c g
 Cyrtopogon laxenecera Bromley, 1935 c g
 Cyrtopogon leleji Lehr, 1998 c g
 Cyrtopogon leptotarsus Curran, 1923 i c g
 Cyrtopogon lineotarsus Curran, 1923 i c g
 Cyrtopogon longibarbus Loew, 1857 c g
 Cyrtopogon longimanus Loew, 1874 i c g
 Cyrtopogon lutatius (Walker, 1849) i c g b
 Cyrtopogon luteicornis (Zetterstedt, 1842) c g
 Cyrtopogon lyratus Osten Sacken, 1878 i c g b
 Cyrtopogon maculipennis (Macquart, 1834) i c g
 Cyrtopogon malistus Richter, 1974 c g
 Cyrtopogon marginalis Loew, 1866 i c g b
 Cyrtopogon melanopleurus Loew, 1866 i g
 Cyrtopogon meyerduerii Mik, 1864 c g
 Cyrtopogon michnoi Lehr, 1998 c g
 Cyrtopogon montanus Loew, 1874 i c g b
 Cyrtopogon nigritarsus Wilcox & Martin, 1936 c g
 Cyrtopogon nitidus Cole, 1924 i c g
 Cyrtopogon nugator Osten Sacken, 1877 i c g
 Cyrtopogon oasis Lehr, 1998 c g
 Cyrtopogon ornatus Oldroyd, 1964 c g
 Cyrtopogon pamirensis Lehr, 1998 c g
 Cyrtopogon pedemontanus (Bezzi, 1927) c g
 Cyrtopogon perrisi Seguy, 1927 c g
 Cyrtopogon perspicax Cole, 1919 i c g
 Cyrtopogon pictipennis Coquillett, 1898 c g
 Cyrtopogon planitarsus Wilcox and Martin, 1936 i c g
 Cyrtopogon platycaudus Curran, 1924 i c g
 Cyrtopogon plausor Osten Sacken, 1877 i c g b
 Cyrtopogon popovi Lehr, 1966 c g
 Cyrtopogon praepes Williston, 1883 i c g
 Cyrtopogon princeps Osten Sacken, 1877 i c g
 Cyrtopogon profusus Osten Sacken, 1877 i c g
 Cyrtopogon pulcher Back, 1909 i c g
 Cyrtopogon pulchripes Loew, 1871 c g
 Cyrtopogon pyrenaeus Villeneuve, 1913 c g
 Cyrtopogon quadripunctatus Hermann, 1906 c g
 Cyrtopogon rainieri Wilcox and Martin, 1936 i c g
 Cyrtopogon rattus Osten Sacken, 1877 i c g
 Cyrtopogon rejectus Osten Sacken, 1877 i c g
 Cyrtopogon robustisetus Lehr, 1998 c g
 Cyrtopogon ruficornis (Fabricius, 1794) c g
 Cyrtopogon rufitibialis Bigot, 1878 c g
 Cyrtopogon rufotarsus Back, 1909 i c g
 Cyrtopogon sabroskyi Lavigne and Bullington, 1981 i c g
 Cyrtopogon sansoni Curran, 1923 i c g
 Cyrtopogon saxicola Lehr, 1998 c g
 Cyrtopogon semitarius Melander, 1923 c g
 Cyrtopogon skopini Lehr, 1998 c g
 Cyrtopogon stenofrons Wilcox and Martin, 1936 i c g
 Cyrtopogon sudator Osten Sacken, 1877 i c g b
 Cyrtopogon svaneticus Lehr, 1998 c g
 Cyrtopogon swezeyi Wilcox and Martin, 1936 i c g
 Cyrtopogon tarbagataicus Lehr, 1998 c g
 Cyrtopogon tenuibarbus Loew, 1856 c g
 Cyrtopogon tenuis Bromley, 1924 i c g
 Cyrtopogon thompsoni Cole, 1921 i c g
 Cyrtopogon tibialis Coquillett, 1904 i c g
 Cyrtopogon transiliensis Lehr, 1998 c g
 Cyrtopogon turgenicus Lehr, 1998 c g
 Cyrtopogon vanduzeei Wilcox and Martin, 1936 i c g
 Cyrtopogon vandykei Wilcox and Martin, 1936 i c g
 Cyrtopogon varans Curran, 1923 i c g
 Cyrtopogon varicornis Bezzi, 1899 c g
 Cyrtopogon villosus Lehr, 1998 c g
 Cyrtopogon vulneratus Melander, 1923 i c g
 Cyrtopogon wilcoxi James, 1942 c g
 Cyrtopogon willistoni Curran, 1922 i c g b

Data sources: i = ITIS, c = Catalogue of Life, g = GBIF, b = Bugguide.net

References